Inner Sanctum Mystery is a radio drama that originally aired on the Blue Network between January 7, 1941, and October 5, 1952. The majority of the original episodes are thought to be lost. Below is a list of episodes and the original airdates.

A total of 527 episodes were produced, but a majority are presumed to be lost. Less than 200 are known to exist today. A number of the episodes that exist are edited versions that were rebroadcast on Armed Forces Radio Service (AFRS) as part of Mystery Playhouse hosted by Peter Lorre. These episodes edited out the commercials as well as the original introductions and postscripts by Raymond. They were replaced with an introduction by Peter Lorre.

Series overview

Episodes

Season 1: 1941 
Inner Sanctum premiered on the Blue Network on January 7, 1941.

Season 5: 1945 
There was no episode broadcast on May 8, 1945, because of V-E Day.

Season 6: 1946

Season 7: 1947

Season 8: 1948

Season 9: 1949

Season 10: 1950

Season 11: 1951

Season 12: 1952 
Many of the shows in season 12 reused previous stories. Some used exactly the same scripts while others used slightly modified scripts. Most of these were recorded using one or more different voice actors than were in the original stories. Because of these differences, they are not technically re-runs, though they are often referred to that way.

See also 
 Old-time radio

References 
Notes

Sources
 Terrace, Vincent (1981).  Radio's golden years: the encyclopedia of radio programs, 1930–1960, San Diego, CA: A.S. Barnes, 
 Lackmann, Ronald W. (2000). The Encyclopedia of American Radio: An A–Z Guide to Radio from Jack Benny to Howard Stern, New York: Facts On File,

External links 
 Inner Sanctum Mysteries – Old Time Radio Researchers Certified Set at the Internet Archive
 Inner Sanctum Mysteries – Single Episodes at the Internet Archive

Inner Sanctum